The Slovenia women's national handball team is the national handball team of Slovenia and takes part in international team handball competitions.

Results

World Championship
 1997 – 18th
 2001 – 9th
 2003 – 8th
 2005 – 14th
 2017 – 14th
 2019 – 19th
 2021 – 17th

European Championship
 2002 – 10th
 2004 – 9th
 2006 – 16th
 2010 – 16th
 2016 – 14th
 2018 – 13th
 2020 – 16th
 2022 – 8th

Current squad
Squad for the 2022 European Women's Handball Championship.

Head coach: Dragan Adžić

References

External links

IHF profile

National team
Handball, Women
Women's national handball teams